José Luís Varela Bustamente (born September 27, 1978) is a Venezuelan professional boxer who has challenged four times for a world mini flyweight championship; the WBO title in 2006, and both the WBA and IBF (twice) titles in 2008.

Amateur career

Varela represented Venezuela at the 2000 Summer Olympics in Sydney, Australia. He was defeated in the round of 32 by Cuba's eventual bronze medalist Maikro Romero.

Professional career
Varela won his first professional title, the WBA Fedebol mini flyweight title, on September 24, 2004, with a unanimous decision victory over Miguel Tellez. He has unsuccessfully challenged for a mini flyweight world title four times in his career. He firstly was defeated by Iván Calderón on October 21, 2006, via unanimous decision in a bout for Calderón's WBO mini flyweight title. He then lost to WBA champion Yutaka Niida on March 1, 2008, via sixth-round knockout. Valera was then defeated by IBF champion Raúl García on September 13, 2008, via unanimous decision. García defeated Valera in a rematch exactly three months later, again by unanimous decision, to retain the title again.

Professional boxing record

References

External links

1978 births
Living people
People from Mérida (state)
Light-flyweight boxers
Boxers at the 2000 Summer Olympics
Olympic boxers of Venezuela
Venezuelan male boxers